Radio Isanganiro, translated: Radio Meetingpoint, is a private radio station in Burundi that has as its goal to support conflict resolution between Hutus and Tutsis. It broadcasts in the languages Kirundi, Swahili and French.

Radio Isanganiro was founded in 2002 by Burundi journalists from various ethnic origins. The program makers are goaling for objectivity through dual-perspective reporting, in which sensationalism is avoided. The phone-in programs attract around three thousand callers a day. Next to reception in Burundi, the programs can be heard in neighboring countries as well. Furthermore it has radio streams on the internet. Next to radio programs, Isanganiro offers trainings an compiles a databank on the sub-region.

The talk show Inyanduruko (translated: The roots of evil) was honored with the prize Radio for Peace Building in 2006. The following year, in 2007, the radio station was honored with a Prince Claus Award from the Netherlands.

References 

Radio stations in Burundi